Michigan is a U.S. state.

Michigan may also refer to:
 Michigan (album), also known as Greetings from Michigan: The Great Lake State, an album by Sufjan Stevens
Michigan, West Virginia
Michigan City, Indiana
Michigan City, North Dakota
 Lake Michigan, one of the Great Lakes, an inland fresh-water sea
 University of Michigan typically the flagship Ann Arbor campus
 Michigan Wolverines, the athletic program of the University of Michigan
 USS Michigan, U.S. Navy ship
 Michigan: Report from Hell, a horror-themed video game released for the PlayStation 2

Other uses
 Michigan goal, a shooting tactic in ice hockey
 Michigan hot dog, a Canadian hot dog slathered with meat sauce, similar to the Coney Island hot dog
 Michigan J. Frog, a Looney Tunes cartoon character
 Michigan (grape), another name for the Catawba grape
 Michigan (1903 automobile), built by the Michigan Automobile Company 1903–1908
 Michigan (1908 automobile), built by the Michigan Buggy Company 1908–1914
 Lake Michigan Shore AVA, Michigan wine region
 One of the Detroit People Mover stations
 , a cargo liner in service 1960-69
 "Michigan", song by The Milk Carton Kids from album Prologue

See also

 Michigan Avenue (disambiguation)
 Michigan City (disambiguation)
 Michigan Township (disambiguation)